The year 2018 is the fourth year in the history of the Rizin Fighting Federation, a mixed martial arts promotion based in Japan. The season started with Rizin Fighting Federation in Fukuoka. It started broadcasting through a television agreement with  Fuji Television. In North America and Europe Rizin FF is available on PPV all over the world and on FITE TV.

Background
Nobuyuki Sakakibara announced that Rizin will do 5 events in 2018: May, July, August, September and the December 31st show.

List of events

Title fights

Rizin 10 - Fukuoka

Rizin 10 - Fukuoka was a mixed martial arts event held by the Rizin Fighting Federation on May 6, 2018 at the Marine Messe Fukuoka in Fukuoka, Japan.

Background
Bantamweight Grand Prix Champion Kyoji Horiguchi was announced to take on fellow veteran Ian McCall in a much anticipated bout that failed to materialize during the New Years Event. Rounding off the marquee match-ups were the kickboxing phenomenon, Tenshin Nasukawa, taking on DEEP flyweight champion Yusaku Nakamura, and newly-crowned atomweight queen Kanna Asakura, who will face former King of the Cage atomweight champion Melissa Karagianis. 

Yachi Yusuke will face off against UFC-vet Diego Nunes, and the Kunlun Fight strawweight champion Weili Zhang was supposed to face Kanako Murata. However, Zhang suffered an injury on her left shoulder during training and was forced to withdraw from the fight. She was replaced by the former TUF 23 cast member Lanchana Green. This event also saw the return of the former Invicta atomweight champion Ayaka Hamasaki, as well as up-and-coming prospects Manel Kape and Kai Asakura.

Results

Rizin 11 - Saitama

Rizin 11 - Saitama was a mixed martial arts event held by the Rizin Fighting Federation on July 29, 2018 at the Saitama Super Arena in Saitama, Japan.

Background
After a 9-second knockout victory, Kyoji Horiguchi made a quick turnaround, in a long-awaited rematch against fellow Japanese champion Hiromasa Ogikubo. Ogikubo, the current Shooto bantamweight champion, has not lost since he last faced Horiguchi in 2013. Another rematch took place with Kanna Asakura taking on RENA, who she defeated in the final of the Atomweight Grand Prix.

Originally Mirko Cro Cop was scheduled for this event, however on May 21, 2018, while training for a bout in Bellator MMA against Roy Nelson, Crocop suffered multiple injuries to his left leg including an ACL tear, a partial MCL tear, and a LCL sprain. It was revealed that the recovery for these injuries would take a minimum of 5 months, and so he was ruled out of the event.

Originally a fight was set between Takanori Gomi and Andy Souwer. However, Souwer was forced to withdrawal due to signing a exclusive contract with ONE Championship. He was replaced by UFC veteran Melvin Guillard at a weight limit of 73.0kg. Guillard weighed in at 73.95kg, forcing the bout to be contested at a catchweight.

Originally a fight was set between Kai Asakura and Topnoi Tiger Muay Thai. However, Asakura was pulled from the event due to a knee injury and replaced by former Tenkaichi Champion Tadaaki Yamamoto

Originally a fight was set between Rin Nakai and Shizuka Sugiyama. However, Nakai was pulled from the event due to acute nephritis, and the bout was cancelled all together.

Results

Rizin 12 - Nagoya

Rizin 12 - Nagoya was a mixed martial arts event held by the Rizin Fighting Federation on August 12, 2018 at the Aichi Prefectural Gymnasium in Nagoya, Japan.

Background
Former Jungle Fight Lightweight Champion Bruno Carvalho was expected to headline this event against Yusuke Yachi, but was forced off the card due to an injury. Carvalho was replaced by the undefeated Luiz Gustavo.

King Reina takes on veteran Kaitlin Young in a women's featherweight bout. Kiichi Kunimoto will face DEEP Welterweight Champion Ryuichiro Sumimura. Mikuru Asakura (who is Kai Asakura's older brother) is expected to face all-time great, Hatsu Hioki. Former UFC competitor Angela Magana makes her promotional debut against Kanako Murata.

Results

Rizin 13 - Saitama

Rizin 13 - Saitama was a mixed martial arts event held by the Rizin Fighting Federation on September 30, 2018 at the Saitama Super Arena in Saitama, Japan.

Background
A champion versus champion affair kicked off the card, as current Pancrase Strawweight Champion Mitsuhisa Sunabe took on reigning DEEP Strawweight Champion Haruo Ochi. Jiří Procházka looked to continue his winning streak against WSOF/PFL veteran Jake Heun. Brothers Mikuru and Kai Asakura fought Karshyga Dautbek and Topnoi Thanongsaklek, respectively. 4-time K-1 champion Taiga Kawabe made his RIZIN debut against fellow debutant Kento Haraguchi.

Miyuu Yamamoto rematched former King of the Cage Atomweight Champion Andy Nguyen; Nguyen defeated Yamamoto at RIZIN's 2016 New Year Eve card. Manel Kape returned to the RIZIN ring for a 5th time, and faced DEEP Flyweight Champion Yusaku Nakamura. Former Invicta Atomweight Champion Ayaka Hamasaki made her second appearance for RIZIN, this time fighting the current DEEP Jewels Atomweight Champion, Mina Kurobe. UFC veterans Daron Cruickshank and Diego Brandao faced off in a lightweight bout.

Mirko Cro Cop returned after a 4-month injury lay-off against DEEP Megaton Champion, Roque Martinez. The first African professional sumo wrestler, Osunaarashi, fought fan-favorite Bob Sapp. The card was headlined by kickboxing sensation Tenshin Nasukawa and Bantamweight Grand Prix Champion Kyoji Horiguchi, in a kickboxing rules bout.

Results

Rizin - Heisei's Last Yarennoka!

Rizin - Heisei's Last Yarennoka! was a mixed martial arts event held by the Rizin Fighting Federation on December 31, 2018 at the Saitama Super Arena in Saitama, Japan.

Background
The card was headlined by former Sengoku, Deep and Pancrase champion Satoru Kitaoka who takes on former Shooto champion Tatsuya Kawajiri in a three-round Lightweight match.

Results

Rizin 14 - Saitama

Rizin 14 - Saitama was a mixed martial arts event held by the Rizin Fighting Federation on December 31, 2018 at the Saitama Super Arena in Saitama, Japan.

Background
The card was headlined by kickboxing sensation Tenshin Nasukawa, who took on multiple weight world boxing champion Floyd Mayweather Jr. in a three-round exhibition boxing match. The match was controversial and drew accusations of match-fixing from both fans and pundits alike.

Emanuel Newton was to face Jiří Procházka at this event, but had to withdraw due to an injury. He was replaced by Brandon Halsey.

Rena Kubota was to face Samantha Jean-Francois  at this event, but had to withdraw due to Anemia and dehydration. The fight was canceled.

Results

References

External links
 http://www.rizinff.com/en/
 http://www.tapology.com/search?term=rizin&mainSearchFilter=events

Rizin Fighting Federation
2018 in mixed martial arts
2018 in Japanese sport
2018 sport-related lists